Peng Yuchang (born October 25, 1994) is a Chinese actor and singer, who gained recognition after appearing in Our Shining Days and Hu Bo's award-winning film An Elephant Sitting Still. He was chosen by CCTV-6's China Movie Report as one of the "New Generation Four Young Actors Skilled in Acting" on 2019, along with Liu Haoran, Leo Wu, and Hu Xianxu.

Forbes China listed Peng on their 30 Under 30 Asia 2019 list which consisted of 30 influential people under 30 years old who have had a substantial effect in their fields. Peng ranked 57th on Forbes China Celebrity 100 list in 2019 and 67th in 2020.

Early life 
Peng Yuchang was born in Xinyu, Jiangxi, China. In his childhood days, he was always looked after by his grandparents because his parents were busy with work. He was trained to play the saxophone from an early age. He studied at the Shanghai Theatre Academy in 2012, majoring in puppetry. During that time, he performed in Come On, My Life! and other theatrical performances.

Career 
Peng made his acting debut in the romance web drama Go Princess Go (2015) and first gained attention for his performance as Eunuch Jiang. In 2016, he starred in a teen web drama Stardom, acting as an aspiring artist.
The same year, Peng took on his first lead role in a fantasy web drama Weapon & Soul. Then he starred in Sohu's self-produced drama Men with Sword.

In 2017, Peng played a swimmer in Chinese sports drama My Mr. Mermaid.
Then he starred in musical campus film Our Shining Days and was nominated for Best Actor at Asian New Talent Awards and Best New Actor at China Movie Channel Media Awards during the 20th Shanghai International Film Festival. The same year, Peng reprised his role in the second season of fantasy web drama Weapon & Soul 2.

In 2018, Peng participated in The Birth of Actors, a hit talent show produced by Zhejiang Satellite TV in which actors and actresses compete with guidance from veteran stars to re-enact famous scenes from TV series or movies. Peng was only promoted to the Top 15, but his three performances with completely different acting styles garnered attention from the audience and gained him praises from judges which consist of renowned celebrities such as Zhang Ziyi, Song Dandan, Liu Ye and Director Peter Chan. As a round's winner, Peng also got a chance to perform with Tao Hong, one of the acclaimed judges in the show to re-enact the scenes from The Last Emperor, where he played Emperor Puyi as both a young and middle-aged man. The same year, Peng starred in a comedy family film Go Brother!, adapted from a web manhua series Please Take My Brother Away by Chinese popular cartoonist Soul Sister. The film was commercially successful and received a 9.2 out of 10 score on Maoyan. Peng was also picked by novelist-turned-filmmaker Hu Bo to star in his drama film An Elephant Sitting Still. The casts were offered to play with zero acting fee because of the low-budget production, however Peng still accepted the role as it was the first time for him to be highly valued by a director. For his performance, Peng was nominated for Best Leading Actor at the 55th Golden Horse Awards.

In 2019, Peng starred in Daylight Entertainment's modern family drama All Is Well, adapted from the fiction novel by Ah Nai. The same year, he starred in the youth sports drama The Prince of Tennis based on the hit manga series by Takeshi Konomi, as a talented tennis teenager Lu Xia, where professional tennis players Li Na and Jiang Shan also guest starred in the drama. The drama was aired on Hunan TV and globally released on Netflix. He also starred in fantasy film Over Again and drama film The Last Wish.

In 2020, Peng starred in Zhang Yibai's critically acclaimed coming-of-age web drama Run For Young. The same year, he played the young version of the head coach of the Chinese women's national volleyball team in Peter Chan's biographical sports film Leap. He also played an aspiring entrepreneur in Derek Hui's hit comedy drama film Coffee or Tea? which received positive reviews and hit 300 million RMB at the box office. The movie became the opening film for the 2020 Golden Rooster and Hundred Flowers Film Festival. Later, he was announced as the volunteers ambassador for the 2020 Hainan Island International Film Festival.

In 2021, Peng starred in musical youth film The Day We Lit Up the Sky, which is the sequel of web drama Run For Young. He also starred in the historical movie The Pioneer. The same year, he was appointed as the National Film Promoter for the 11th Beijing International Film Festival.

He is also known for his television work in the program Back To Field which he actively participated in for five consecutive years.

Filmography

Film

Television series

Variety show

Discography

Albums

Singles

Awards and nominations

References

External links 
 
 

1994 births
Living people
Chinese male television actors
Chinese male film actors
Male actors from Jiangxi
People from Xinyu
21st-century Chinese male actors
Shanghai Theatre Academy alumni